Local Licks: Yule Rock! is a Holiday album released by KLBJ featuring local Austin musicians.

Track listing
George Devore & The Roam: "Winter Wonderland" – 2:46
Cadillac Voodoo Choir: "Ho, Ho, Home for Christmas" – 3:20
Dexter Freebish: "Last Christmas" – 3:09
Reckless Kelly: "The Lonesome Little Cowboy" – 4:00
David Grissom: "Little Drummer Boy" – 5:07
Vallejo: "Feliz Navidad" – 3:47
Trish Murphy & Darin Murphy: "You're a Mean One, Mr. Grinch" – 3:45
Stephen Doster & Will Sexton: "Jingle Bells" – 2:46
Beth Black: "Santa Baby" – 4:11
Lonelyland: "All I Want for Christmas Is My Methadone" – 3:59
The Dave Sebree Band featuring Lisa Tingle: "God Rest Ye Merry Gentlemen" – 5:05
Lisa Tingle with The Dave Sebree Band: "Have Yourself a Merry Little Christmas" – 2:40
Ian Moore: "It Just Don't Seem Like Christmas" – 2:40
PigGie Hat: "Do You Remember December?" – 3:25
Pushmonkey: "Auld Lang Syne" – 2:58

1999 Christmas albums
Christmas compilation albums
1999 compilation albums